Juan Carlos López Fernández (born 7 November 1965) is a Mexican politician from the Party of the Democratic Revolution. From 2009 to 2012 he served as Deputy of the LXI Legislature of the Mexican Congress representing Chiapas, and previously served in the LXIII Legislature of the Congress of Chiapas.

References

1965 births
Living people
Politicians from Chiapas
Party of the Democratic Revolution politicians
21st-century Mexican politicians
Members of the Congress of Chiapas
Deputies of the LXI Legislature of Mexico
Members of the Chamber of Deputies (Mexico) for Chiapas